{{Infobox boxing match
| fight date = June 7, 1996
| Fight Name = Ultimate Glory
| location = Caesars Palace, Paradise, Nevada, US
| image = 
| fighter1 = Julio César Chávez
| nickname1 = The Great Mexican Champion
| record1 = 97–1–1 (79 KO)
| height1 = 5 ft 7 in
| weight1 = 139 lb
| style1 = Orthodox
| hometown1 = Culiacán, Mexico
| recognition1 = WBC super lightweight champion3-division world champion
| fighter2 = Oscar De La Hoya
| nickname2 = The Golden Boy
| record2 = 21–0 (19 KO)
| hometown2 = East Los Angeles, California, US
| height2 = 5 ft 10 in
| weight2 = 139 lb
| style2 = Orthodox
| recognition2 = WBO lightweight champion[[The Ring (magazine)|The Ring]] No. 4 ranked pound-for-pound fighter2-division world champion
| titles = WBC super lightweight title
|result =  De La Hoya wins via 4th-round [[technical knockout|TKO]]
}}

Julio César Chávez vs. Oscar De La Hoya, billed as Ultimate Glory'', was a professional boxing match contested on June 7, 1996 for the WBC super lightweight championship.

Background
After both Julio César Chávez and Oscar De La Hoya defeated their opponents (Scott Walker and Darryl Tyson respectively) in tune-up bouts on February 9, 1996, the two fighters agreed to face one another in a "dream match" set for June of that year. The undefeated De La Hoya had already won world titles in two divisions and was looking to capture a third world title in a third weight class at only 23–years old. The 33–year old Chavez, meanwhile, was entering his 100th fight and still possessed one of the most impressive records in boxing history, having gone 97–1–1 and capturing four world titles in three divisions in his 16–year career. The bout was highly anticipated, with some even calling the biggest fight in Latino boxing history and both fighters taking home a then–career high $9 million purse. Despite his vast experience advantage over De La Hoya (who had only partaken in 21 pro fights up to that point) and his status as champion, the aging Chavez was initially installed as a 3–1 underdog before odds were dropped to 2–1 by the time of the fight. Though both fighters were of Mexican heritage, most Mexican and Mexican–American fans favored Chavez as De La Hoya had been born in the United States. In promotional stops for their fight, De La Hoya was largely booed by the largely Hispanic populations of Phoenix, San Diego and even his native Los Angeles.

A controversial decision was made prior to the fight as De La Hoya's promoter Bob Arum refused to let the fight be carried on Pay-per-view and instead opted for it to be shown almost exclusively on closed-circuit television, severely limiting the highly anticipated bouts audience. Arum claimed that he made the decision to combat the use of illegal "black boxes", which steal pay-per-view signals and allow its users to watch the program for free. Though Arum claimed that the fight would net somewhere between $60 to $90 million even without pay-per-view, the fight drew a somewhat disappointing crowd of 750,000, down from the 1.7 million fans Arum had expected, and fell well short of his expected earnings, with the fight grossing around $14 million.

The fight
The fight lasted less than four rounds. Only one minute into round one, De La Hoya connected with a straight right hand that opened up a huge gash around Chavez' eye. The fight was temporally halted not even a minute later as the cut had become severe enough for the referee Joe Cortez to stop the action and allow Chavez to find a towel. Though Chavez was able to continue, he was unable to get any momentum and was dominated by De La Hoya for the remainder of the fight. In round four, as Chavez was finally mounting some offense, De La Hoya took control of the latter stages of the round and brutalized Chavez with a series of hard combinations and broke Chavez' nose with a left hook. As the cut around his eye had deteriorated even further, Cortez halted the fight once again and sent him to ringside physician Flip Homansky. Homansky then informed Cortez that Chavez could not continue due to the multiple lacerations to his face and De La Hoya was awarded with the TKO victory at 2:37 of the fourth round.

References

1996 in boxing
1996 in sports in Nevada
Boxing matches involving Oscar De La Hoya
Boxing in Las Vegas
June 1996 sports events in the United States
Caesars Palace